Lusail Stadium, is a football stadium in Lusail, Qatar. Owned by the Qatar Football Association, it is the largest stadium in Qatar and the Middle East by capacity and one of eight stadiums built for the 2022 FIFA World Cup, during which it hosted the final game between Argentina and France on 18 December 2022. It is currently the fourth largest stadium in Asia but eventually will reduce its current capacity of 88,966 to 40,000 in the near future.

Lusail Stadium was inaugurated on 9 September 2022 with the Lusail Super Cup game.

Construction 

The procurement process for the stadium conversion began in 2014. The stadium was built as a joint venture by HBK Contracting and the China Railway Construction Corporation.

Like the other stadiums planned for the 2022 World Cup, the Lusail Stadium is cooled using solar power and is claimed to have zero carbon footprint.

Construction began on 11 April 2017. Completion of the stadium was originally scheduled for 2020. It was then to host three friendly matches until the 2022 World Cup, but as the completion of the stadium was postponed, it is subsequently hosting 10 games including the final.

Following the World Cup, it is expected to be reconfigured into a 40,000-seat stadium. Excess seating will be removed and other parts of the building repurposed as a community space with shops, cafés, athletic and education facilities, and a health clinic.

Like other stadiums constructed for the 2022 FIFA World Cup, Lusail Stadium received a five-star rating on 16 August 2022 for its design and construction from the GSAS.

A 2021 investigation by The Guardian revealed that over 6,500 migrant workers from Bangladesh, India, Pakistan, Nepal and Sri Lanka died between 2010 and 2020 during construction of World Cup venues in Qatar. The figures used by The Guardian did not include occupation or place of work so deaths could not be definitively associated with the World Cup construction programme. Commenting on the investigation, Construction News recalled.

Sports

Lusail Super Cup
On 9 September 2022, the Lusail Stadium hosted the Saudi-Egyptian Super Cup, a tournament that served as a rehearsal for the World Cup finals, held between the two teams of Al Hilal, the 2021–22 Saudi Arabian champion, and Zamalek, the 2021–22 Egyptian champion, in front of 77,575 fans. The two sides played out 1–1 draw, with Al Hilal triumphing 4–1 after a penalty shootout.

2022 FIFA World Cup
Lusail Stadium hosted 10 matches during the 2022 FIFA World Cup, including the final. 

During the World Cup quarterfinal, American journalist Grant Wahl collapsed at the stadium. He could not be revived. The cause of death was an aneurysm. After that game, a staff member died after he fell down from a high altitude.

See also
 Lusail Sports Arena, Lusail, Qatar

References

External links

Lusail Stadium at Qatar 2022
FIFA World Cup 2022 Schedule PDF

2021 establishments in Qatar
2022 FIFA World Cup stadiums
Lusail
Sports venues completed in 2021
Foster and Partners buildings